The 1949–50 FAW Welsh Cup is the 63rd season of the annual knockout tournament for competitive football teams in Wales.

Key
League name pointed after clubs name.
CCL - Cheshire County League
FL D3N - Football League Third Division North
FL D3S - Football League Third Division South
SFL - Southern Football League

Fifth round
Seven winners from the Fourth round and eleven new clubs. Caernarvon Town get a bye to the Sixth round.

Sixth round
One winner from the Fifth round and Caernarvon Town. Seven other clubs get a bye to the Seventh round.

Seventh round
One winner from the Sixth round plus seven clubs who get a bye in the previous round.

Semifinal
Swansea Town and Mertyr Tydfil played at Cardiff.

Final
Final were held at Cardiff.

External links
The FAW Welsh Cup

1949-50
Wales
Cup